Martin Cole may refer to:
Martin Cole (sexologist) (1931–2015), British sexologist, author and film-maker
Martin Cole (actor) British actor